Mats Ekman (12 March 1865 – 13 March 1934) was an Estonian-Swedish poet from Ätsve in Noaroots parish, Estonia.

Works

Poetry
 Prästn e vargskall: dikter, recorded by Ing (2005)

References

Further reading 
 Estonian Writers' Online Dictionary: Mats Ekman
 Estlandssvensk 2011, No. 2, pp. 32-33
 RONOR, 3-4, 1990, p. 7
 Rooslepa kalmistu - Noarootsi Vallavalitsus
 Eesti rahvusbibliograafia

1865 births
1934 deaths
Estonian male poets
19th-century Estonian poets
20th-century Estonian poets
Estonian people of Swedish descent
People from Lääne-Nigula Parish